Graphotism (subtitled The International Graffiti Writers Publication) was a magazine published in the United Kingdom and distributed internationally, which covered the subject of street art and graffiti. It is widely regarded as the most popular graffiti publication by graffiti writers, and was a quarterly definitive collection of street art all over the world.

Graphotism was published between 1992 and September 2011.

References

External links
 Official website

1992 establishments in the United Kingdom
2011 disestablishments in the United Kingdom
Defunct magazines published in the United Kingdom
Graffiti and unauthorised signage
Magazines established in 1992
Magazines disestablished in 2011
Quarterly magazines published in the United Kingdom
Visual arts magazines published in the United Kingdom
Magazines published in London